Rómulo Sebastián Naón Peralta Martínez (1875–1941), was an Argentine lawyer, politician and Ambassador to the United States from 1910 to 1919.

Biography
He was born in 1876 in Buenos Aires to Julio César Naón Capanegra and Felisa Peralta Martínez de Oliden. He married Isabel Rodríguez Marcenal. In 1914 he attended the Niagara Falls peace conference to reduce tensions between Mexico and the United States. He died in 1941.

On March 4, 1915 Naón and two others received the Thanks of Congress and were awarded Congressional Gold Medals (P.L. 63-75, 38 Stat. 1228). The statute reads as follows.
 
Resolved by the Senate and House of Representatives of the United States of America in Congress assembled, That the thanks of Congress to their excellencies be, and they are hereby, presented to their excellencies Señor Domício da Gama, Señor Rómulo S. Naón, and Señor Eduardo Suárez for their generous services as mediators in the controversy between the Government of the United States of America and the leaders of the warring parties in the Republic of Mexico. That the President of the United States is hereby authorized and requested to cause to be made and presented to their excellencies Señor Domicio da Gama, Señor Rómulo S. Naón, and Señor Eduardo Suárez suitable gold medals, appropriately inscribed, which shall express the high estimation in which Congress holds the services of these distinguished statesmen, and the Republics which they represent, in the promotion of peace and order in the American continent.

References

External links

Romulo S. Naon at the Library of Congress
The American Statesmen's Yearbook

1875 births
1941 deaths
Ambassadors of Argentina to the United States
Argentine diplomats
20th-century Argentine lawyers
Argentine politicians
Congressional Gold Medal recipients
Lawyers from Buenos Aires
University of Buenos Aires alumni
Burials at La Recoleta Cemetery